Long Biên Bridge is a historic cantilever bridge across the Red River that connects two districts, Hoàn Kiếm and Long Biên of the city of Hanoi, Vietnam. It was originally called Paul Doumer Bridge.

History 
The bridge was built in 1899–1902 by the architects Daydé & Pillé of Paris, and opened in 1903. Before North Vietnam's independence in 1954, it was called Paul-Doumer Bridge, named after Paul Doumer – the governor-general of French Indochina and then French president. At  in length, it was, at that time, one of the longest bridges in Asia. For the French colonial government, the construction was of strategic importance in securing control of northern Vietnam. From 1899 to 1902, more than 3,000 Vietnamese took part in the construction.

Vietnam War
It was heavily bombed during Vietnam War due to its critical position (the only bridge at that time across the Red River connecting Hanoi to the main port of Haiphong). The first attack took place in 1967, and the center span of the bridge was felled by an attack by 20 United States Air Force (USAF) F-105 fighter-bombers on 11 August. CIA reports noted that the severing of the bridge did not appear to have caused as much disruption as had been expected.

On 10 May 1972 the bridge was attacked in the first Operation Linebacker attacks in response to the North Vietnamese Easter Offensive. On 13 May the USAF announced that several spans of the bridge had been destroyed by laser-guided bombs (LGB). On 9 August the USAF announced that another LGB attack had disabled the newly repaired bridge. On 11 September the USAF attacked the bridge again as repairs were nearing completion.

The defence of Long Bien Bridge continues to play a large role in Hanoi's self-image and is often extolled in poetry and song.

Modern day
Some parts of the original structure remain intact, while large sections have been built later to repair the holes. Only half the bridge retains its original shape. A project with support and loan from the French government is currently in progress to restore the bridge to its original appearance.

Today trains, mopeds, bicycles and pedestrians use the dilapidated bridge, while all other traffic is diverted to the nearby Chương Dương Bridge and some newly built bridges: Thanh Trì Bridge, Thăng Long Bridge, Vĩnh Tuy Bridge, and Nhật Tân Bridge.

Under the bridge, poor families live in boats on the Red River, coming from many rural areas of Vietnam.

Image gallery

References 

Hong River
Bridges in Hanoi
Bridges completed in 1903
Cantilever bridges
Railway bridges in Vietnam
Steel bridges